KOLK 94.3 FM is a radio station licensed to Lakeside, Montana.  The station broadcasts a country music format and is owned by KOFI, Inc.

References

External links
KOLK's official website

OLK
Country radio stations in the United States